Wilfriede Hoffmann (27 November 1932 – 28 January 2010) was a German athlete. She competed in the women's shot put at the 1960 Summer Olympics.

References

1932 births
2010 deaths
Athletes (track and field) at the 1960 Summer Olympics
German female shot putters
Olympic athletes of the United Team of Germany
Polish people of German descent
People from Poznań Voivodeship (1921–1939)
Sportspeople from Greater Poland Voivodeship
People from Chodzież County